Hoosac is an unincorporated community in Fergus County, in the U.S. state of Montana.

History
Hoosac contained a post office from 1914 until 1919. The community took its name after the nearby Hoosac Tunnel.

References

Unincorporated communities in Fergus County, Montana
Unincorporated communities in Montana